The 2016 Fórmula 4 Sudamericana Championship season is the third season of the Formula 4 Sudamericana. It began on 3 April at the Autódromo Víctor Borrat Fabini in Uruguay, and finished on 4 December at the same venue, after ten rounds at three venues in Uruguay.

Drivers

Race calendar and results
The calendar was made public on 21 March. As opposed to the previous season, where races were held in Uruguay, Argentina and Brazil, the 2016 season was consisted of ten races held solely in Uruguay to reduce costs. The grid for race 2 is determined by the finishing order of race 1, but with the top 6 reversed. Double points were awarded for both round 10 races.

Championship standings

Points system
Points were awarded as follows:

Fórmula 4 Sudamericana

References

External links
 

Fórmula 4 Sudamericana seasons
Sudamericana
Formula 4